"I Should Be Sleeping" is a song written by Shaye Smith and Lisa Drew, and recorded by Canadian country music group Emerson Drive. It was released in October 2001 as their first single from their debut self-titled album, Emerson Drive. The song reached the Top 5 on the U.S. Billboard Hot Country Songs chart, reaching a peak of number 4. It also peaked at number 35 on the U.S. Billboard Hot 100, making it their first crossover hit.

Music video
The music video was directed by Thom Oliphant and premiered in late 2001.

Chart positions
"I Should Be Sleeping" debuted at number 57 on the U.S. Billboard Hot Country Singles & Tracks for the chart week of November 10, 2001.

Year-end charts

References

2001 singles
Emerson Drive songs
Song recordings produced by James Stroud
DreamWorks Records singles
Songs written by Shaye Smith
Song recordings produced by Julian King (recording engineer)
2001 songs